Katarina Agnes Wigander (born 1983 in Lerum, Västergötland) is a model and former Miss Sweden.

Her victory in the beauty pageant was controversial in her home country, as she was crowned by Moore Magazine, a magazine for men which publishes pictures for other Swedish "men's" magazines, such as Slitz. In 2004, Moore Magazine and Bingo Rimér managed to take over crowning after the old arrangers had stopped holding the pageant after 2003. Wigander was the only Miss Sweden to be crowned under this regime, as there was no 2005 Miss Sweden, and "New Miss Sweden" was staged from 2006. For this reason, her title is sometimes said to be "unofficial".

References 

1983 births
Living people
Miss Universe 2004 contestants
People from Lerum Municipality
Swedish beauty pageant winners
Swedish female models